Hokky Caraka Bintang Brilliant (born 21 August 2004) is an Indonesian professional footballer who plays as a forward for Liga 1 club PSS Sleman and the Indonesia national under-20 team.

Club career

PSS Sleman
He was signed for PSS Sleman to play in Liga 1 in the 2021 season. Hokky made his professional league debut on 25 September 2021 in a match against Madura United at the Gelora Bung Karno Madya Stadium, Jakarta.

International career
On 30 May 2022, Caraka made his debut for an Indonesian youth team against a Venezuela U-20 squad in the 2022 Maurice Revello Tournament in France.
On 4 July 2022, Caraka scored a quatrick against Brunei U-19 in a 7–0 win in the 2022 AFF U-19 Youth Championship.

On 14 September 2022, Hokky scored a hattrick against Timor-Leste U-20, in a 4–0 win in the 2023 AFC U-20 Asian  Cup qualification. In October 2022, it was reported that Hokky received a call-up from the Indonesia U-20 for a training camp, in Turkey and Spain.

Career statistics

Club

Notes

International goals
International under-20 goals

References

External links
 Hokky Caraka at Soccerway
 Hokky Caraka at Liga Indonesia

2004 births
Living people
Indonesian footballers
Liga 1 (Indonesia) players
PSS Sleman players
Association football forwards
People from Gunung Kidul Regency
Sportspeople from Special Region of Yogyakarta
Indonesia youth international footballers